Embarcadero station is a combined BART and Muni Metro rapid transit station in the Market Street subway in downtown San Francisco. Located under Market Street between Drumm Street and Beale Street near The Embarcadero, it serves the Financial District neighborhood and surrounding areas. The three-level station has a large fare mezzanine level, with separate platform levels for Muni Metro and BART below. Embarcadero station opened in May 1976 – almost two years after service began through the Transbay Tube – as an infill station.

With over 11,000 daily passenger entrances on weekdays, Embarcadero and Montgomery Street stations are the two busiest in the BART system. A major Bay Area transit hub, Embarcadero is also served by numerous bus routes of several other agencies which stop above the station and on surrounding streets.

Station layout 

Like the three other shared Muni/BART stations in the Market Street subway, Embarcadero has three underground levels. The uppermost level is a fare mezzanine, with one Muni paid area in the middle flanked by two BART paid areas. The second level has a single island platform (of which only the center portion is used) for Muni Metro, and the third level has an island platform for BART. The station is narrower than the other three –  rather than  – because of adjacent buildings and the high water table. It has six street entrances along its length. The station contains an unused underground entrance to the 388 Market Street building.

History 

Service at the station began on May 27, 1976, three years after the other San Francisco stations. The station was not part of the original plans for the system. As a result of increasing development in the lower Market Street area, the basic structure of the station was added into the construction of the Market Street subway, anticipating a later opening. The later opening resulted in the Embarcadero station having a different design than the other three Market Street stations. The station was designed by chief BART architect Tallie Maule and Hertzka & Knowles & Associates in collaboration with Parsons Brinckerhoff, Tudor Construction, and Bechtel. The station cost $30 million to construct.

Muni Metro service began in February 1980 and Embarcadero was originally intended to be the inbound terminus for all of the Muni Metro lines. In 1998 a new southward extension was opened, extending the N Judah along the Embarcadero to the Caltrain station at 4th and King Streets. On March 4, 2000, F Market & Wharves streetcar service was extended northward to Fisherman's Wharf, with new stops above Embarcadero station at Main Street (inbound) and Drumm Street (outbound).

Because the station is adjacent to the Transbay Tube, brake dust and other particles from train operations coat the walls of the station. A sandblasting in 2014 revealed the original white terrazzo platform walls under the dark grime.

Since before 1992, the station was serenaded by Ronald Brewington, known as the "Jazz Man". He would play saxophone for commuters, and entertain them with conversation and charm. He claimed his name was Garrick Sherrod; however, that was an identity he had stolen. The Jazz Man was actually a fugitive from Albuquerque facing capital murder charges stemming from the 1987 death of his wife Diedre. He was arrested at a BART station in 2012, and extradited to New Mexico. In 2013, he pleaded guilty to the murder and was sentenced to 16 years in prison.

Following the 2015 addition of a canopy over an escalator at 19th Street Oakland station, which reduced escalator downtime by one-third, BART decided to add canopies to all downtown Oakland and San Francisco entrances. Construction of the Market Street entrances was to begin in 2020, with completion in 2027. The entrances on the southern side of the station were closed from April 13, 2020, to May 15, 2021, due to low ridership during the COVID-19 pandemic. Concourse-level preparation for canopy construction at Embarcadero station began on November 15, 2021. Construction of the canopy at Davis Street began on June 13, 2022, with completion originally expected in January 2023.

In February 2022, BART added a faregate on the platform at the elevator. This allows passengers using the elevator to enter and exit fare control through the faregate, rather than having to use a "difficult and cumbersome" process of tagging in or out at the concourse faregates.

Artwork 

Although original plans to include public art at every BART station did not come to fruition, several artworks were included in Embarcadero station. The platform walls and street entrances feature circle-based reliefs by William Mitchell. Wall Canyon, a -high colored ceramic relief by Stephen De Staebler, is partially hidden behind a staircase at the southwest end of the station. It was installed on January 1, 1977. A duotone granite portrait of Tallie Maule – the chief architect of the original BART system – is on the mezzanine level.

A -tall,  rope sculpture called Legs was installed at the northwest end of the station in 1976 or 1978. Created by Barbara Shawcroft, the orange-and-white Nomex sculpture moved with the breeze from passing Muni and BART trains. Legs soon accumulated the same dark grime as the station walls, hiding the original color. BART was required by the artist's contract to clean the sculpture but several attempts were unsuccessful. In 2013, BART included removal of Legs in its 2014 budget, which prompted a debate about whether it should be cleaned regardless of cost (which Shawcroft supported), or removed from the unsuitable environment of the station. The sculpture was removed in June 2014 and returned to Shawcroft – a professor emerita at UC Davis School of Design – who planned to repurpose it into other pieces.

Connections 

Embarcadero station is located in the busy Financial District; numerous routes by several transit providers stop at or near the station. Most radial Muni bus routes terminate at several nearby locations:
The California Street line of the San Francisco cable car system terminates adjacent to the Drumm Street station entrance. Muni's F Market and Wharves heritage streetcar line stops on the surface at Market and Main (westbound) and Market and Drumm (eastbound).

A number of Golden Gate Transit bus routes stop near Embarcadero on Fremont Street (2, 4, 38, 44, 54, 56, 58, 72, 72X, 74, 76) and/or Pine Street (2, 4, 8, 18, 24, 24X). Other transit agencies that stop nearby include SamTrans (292, 397, 398, 713, FCX) and PresidiGo (Downtown Shuttle).

Embarcadero station is the nearest Muni Metro and BART station to the Ferry Building, the primary San Francisco terminal for Golden Gate Ferry, San Francisco Bay Ferry and Treasure Island Ferry. The second phase of the Transbay Transit Center – the Downtown Rail Extension – will include an -long pedestrian tunnel under Beale Street connecting Embarcadero station with the underground rail concourse.

References

External links 

BART: Embarcadero station
SFMTA: Embarcadero inbound, outbound
SF Bay Transit (unofficial): MUNI Metro Embarcadero Station, Embarcadero BART station

Bay Area Rapid Transit stations in San Francisco
Stations on the Yellow Line (BART)
Stations on the Green Line (BART)
Stations on the Red Line (BART)
Stations on the Blue Line (BART)
Muni Metro stations
Financial District, San Francisco
Market Street (San Francisco)
Railway stations in the United States opened in 1976
United States bike stations
Railway stations located underground in California